Asia Satellite Telecommunications Holdings Limited, known by its brand name AsiaSat, is a commercial operator of communication spacecraft. AsiaSat, based in Hong Kong, is incorporated in Bermuda.

AsiaSat is jointly owned by Chinese state-owned CITIC Limited and private equity fund The Carlyle Group L.P. indirectly. It had a market capitalization of HK$2 billion on 30 November 2018. It was a red chip company of the stock exchange. On 23 August 2019, the take private proposal scheme was approved by AsiaSat's public shareholders, followed by the approval of the Bermuda Court on 3 September 2019, whereupon the Company became a private wholly owned subsidiary of Bowenvale Limited, a joint venture of CITIC and Carlyle. The listing of the company's shares was withdrawn from the Stock Exchange of Hong Kong on 5 September 2019.

History 
In September 2017, AsiaSat 9, AsiaSat's latest satellite built by Space Systems/Loral was successfully launched and replaced AsiaSat 4 at 122° East.

AsiaSat owns and operates seven satellites, including AsiaSat 3S, AsiaSat 4, AsiaSat 5, AsiaSat 6, AsiaSat 7, AsiaSat 8 and the new AsiaSat 9.

Shareholders 
, the direct parent company, Bowenvale Limited, owned 74.43% shares; Bowenvale was jointly owned by CITIC Limited and The Carlyle Group LP in a 50–50 ratio. Standard Life Aberdeen plc was the second largest shareholder for 5.36%. In May 2018, the ratio owned by Standard Life Aberdeen had decreased to 4.99%. In November 2018, another private equity firm International Value Advisers owned 6.12% shares of AsiaSat.

On 3 September 2019, following the approval of the privatisation plan by public shareholders, Asia Satellite Telecommunications Holdings Limited became a privately wholly owned subsidiary of Bowenvale Limited, which is now jointly owned by CITIC Group Corporation and Carlyle Asia Partners IV, L.P.

Launch history and future plans 
This is a list of AsiaSat satellites.

See also 

 APT Satellite Holdings, fellow satellite communication company based in Hong Kong

References

External links 
 

 
1988 establishments in Hong Kong
Telecommunications companies established in 1988
Companies listed on the Hong Kong Stock Exchange
Communications satellite operators
Direct broadcast satellite services
Aerospace companies of Hong Kong
Telecommunications companies of Hong Kong
CITIC Group
The Carlyle Group companies
Offshore companies of Bermuda
Hong Kong brands